Shorea ciliata is a species of plant in the family Dipterocarpaceae. It is a tree found in Peninsular Malaysia.

References

ciliata
Trees of Peninsular Malaysia
Endangered plants
Taxonomy articles created by Polbot